Yasuyuki Nakai (August 7, 1954 – August 9, 2014) was a Japanese baseball player.

References

External links
Baseball statistics

Japanese baseball players
Yomiuri Giants players
1954 births
2014 deaths